Mary Ann Kennedy is an American country music songwriter. In her career, she has been a member of the groups Calamity Jane and Kennedy Rose, both times pairing with fellow songwriter Pam Rose. Kennedy's co-writing credits include the Grammy Award-nominated songs "Ring on Her Finger, Time on Her Hands" by Lee Greenwood and "I'll Still Be Loving You" by Restless Heart. Other songs that she has written include "Safe in the Arms of Love" by Martina McBride and "You Will" by Patty Loveless.

Discography
The Trail Less Traveled (2000)
Hoofbeats, Heartbeats & Wings (2005)
The Rhythm of the Ride (2009)

Chart Singles Written by Mary Ann Kennedy

The following is a list of Mary Ann Kennedy compositions that were chart hits.

References

American women country singers
Place of birth missing (living people)
American country singer-songwriters
Living people
American country drummers
Year of birth missing (living people)
Kennedy Rose members
Calamity Jane (band) members